Maizhokunggar County or Meldro Gungkar County is a county of Lhasa and east of the main center of Chengguan, Tibet Autonomous Region. Most of the people are ethnic Tibetan and are engaged in agriculture or herding. Mining is a major source of tax revenue, but has created environmental problems. The county has various tourist attractions including hot springs and the Drigung Monastery.

Geography

Meldro Gungkar means "The Place where Nagaraja Meldro lived" in Tibetan.
"Mozhugongka" means a town at the end of the earth. It is a twin city of Nanjing.
The county is located on the middle and upper sections of the Lhasa River (or Kyi River) and the west of Mila Mountain.
The Gyama Zhungchu, which runs through Gyama Township, is a tributary of the Lhasa River.

Carboniferous sediments are found in the Lhunzub district of the Lhasa Terrane and to the south of Jang Co in the north of the terrane, but fossiliferous Lower Carboniferous has been found in the terrane only in the Maizokunggar district. The  stratum is mainly composed of alternating layers of quartose sandstone, slates and subordinate limestones that include the coral Kueichowphyllum sp.

Climate
Mozhugongka County is in the semi-arid plateau temperate monsoon climate zone, with cold, dry and thin air, and high winds in winter and spring. 
There are about 90 frost-free days each year. 

Population
The total population as of 2010 was 48,561 people in 9,719 households, the great majority engaged in farming and herding.
98% of the population are ethnic Tibetan.

Administrative divisions

From 1987 the seat of government has been in Kunggar in the west of the county.
The main towns and villages include Kunggar and Zaxoi. Administrative divisions are:

 Kunggar Town
 Gyama Township
 Tanggya Township
 Zhaxigeng Township
 Nyimajangra Township
 Zaxoi Township
 Rutog Township
 Mamba Township

Economy

Many of the people depend on agriculture, including farming and herding. Development efforts include increased farm animal husbandry, feedstock production, greenhouses for vegetables, and breeding programs.
Crops include barley, winter wheat, spring wheat, canola, peas, cabbage, carrots, eggplant, cucumbers, lettuce, spinach, green peppers, pumpkins, potatoes and other greenhouse crops.
In 2007 the county produced  of food products, and had 235,000 livestock excluding horses.
Traditional folk handicrafts include pottery, willow basketwork, wooden objects, mats and gold and silver items.
The county is especially noted for its pottery, which does not corrode, retains heat and has an ethnic style. It has a more-than-1000-year-old history.

China National Highway 318 runs through the county from east to west.
Television is available to 36% of the population and radio to 48%.
There is one high school, 14 full primary schools and 74 village schools.
Mozhugongka has been selected as a Cooperative Medical System experimental site, which has resulted in a very high percentage of people with health care coverage.
Efforts are being made to improve telecommunications and the road system and to attract tourists.

Construction of the Zhikong Hydro Power Station in Maizhokunggar County began in May 2003.
The project cost 1.37 billion yuan. The dam impounds  of water. The 100 MW power station came into operation in September 2007.
Another 26 small and medium-sized hydropower stations have a total installed capacity of 2,310 kilowatts.

The economy is driven by mineral extraction, which was expected to account for 73.85% of total tax revenue in 2007 while employing 419 people.
Extensive mining in the mountainous regions between Gyama and Zibuk have turned areas of what was green pasturage into a grey wasteland. 
The authorities are reported to have suppressed protests by the local people.

It produces gold, molybdenum, and copper. Mining by the state-owned firm replaced small private mines in the area in 2006. About $500 million was invested in construction of the mining facility between 2008 and 2010. The mine, which is upstream of Lhasa, presents water pollution issues and has a history of rocky relations with local residents, many of whom have been displaced and relocated. In March 2013 the 2013 Gyama Mine landslide which killed 83, mostly Han miners, resulted in international attention by the media.

Landmarks

Scenic spots include the Bri-gung (Drigung) Monastery and the Dezhong Hot Spring, as well as the nature reserves.
The Drikhung Thil Monastery of the Kagyu Sect was founded in 1179 by Lingchen Repa, a disciple of Phagmo Drupa.
The monastery is the home of the Drikhung Kagyu School of the Kagyu sect.
The Dezhong Hot Spring has abundant supplies of water, and was historically thought to have magical curative powers. 
It is popular with both tourists and local people.
There are 47 religious sites with 634 Buddhist monks and nuns as of 2010. The 29 the monasteries consist of 11 of the Gelug sect, 16 of the Kagyu, 1 of the Nyingma and 1 of the Sakya.
Jama wetland in Mozhugongka county is vulnerable to grazing and climate change.

The ruined Gyama Palace, in the Gyama Gully in the south of the county, was built by Namri Songtsen in the 6th century after he had gained control of the area from Supi. 
Songtsän Gampo, his son, was born in the palace.
The traces of the mountainside palace indicate that it was an impressive complex. Three more recent white pagodas mark Songtsen Gampo's birthplace. 
Later the dynasty moved the capital of Tubo (Tibet) to Lhasa in 633 AD.
Gyama was the site of fierce battles against the Mongolian Güshi Khan, who had been invited to Tibet by the Gelug sect.
Beside the palace there are ruins of various fortifications from the Yuan (1271–1368) and Ming (1368–1644) dynasties.

References

Sources

 

 
Counties of Tibet